Renuka Jeyapalan is a Tamil Canadian film and television director. Her debut short film Big Girl won the Toronto International Film Festival Award for Best Canadian Short Film at the 2005 Toronto International Film Festival and was a shortlisted Genie Award finalist for Best Live Action Short Drama at the 27th Genie Awards. After directing the short films Arranged (2014) and A Bicycle Lesson (2016), she co-directed the 2017 feature film Ordinary Days with Kris Booth and Jordan Canning. Stay the Night, her solo feature debut, premiered in 2022.

As a television director, Jeyapalan has directed episodes of Murdoch Mysteries, Kim's Convenience, Workin' Moms, Ginny and Georgia, Son of a Critch, and Sort Of, among others. She was nominated for Best Director in a Comedy Series at the 2022 Canadian Screen Awards for directing the Sort Of episode "Sort Of A Party".

References

External links

Canadian people of Indian descent
People of Indian Tamil descent
Canadian women film directors
Canadian television directors
Canadian women television directors
Canadian Film Centre alumni
Living people
Year of birth missing (living people)
Asian-Canadian filmmakers

Canadian women screenwriters